Aleksas Abromavičius (born 6 December 1984) is a discus thrower, who competes internationally for Lithuania. His personal record is 63.32 metres reached in 2010 Lithuanian Athletics Championships.

Achievements

References

1984 births
Living people
Lithuanian male discus throwers